Deo Kanda A Mukok (born 11 August 1989) is a Congolese footballer who plays for Tanzanian club Simba as a forward.

Career
Born in Matadi, Déo Kanda began playing youth football for Jack Trésor FC. He signed his first professional contract with Kinshasa side DC Motema Pembe. He moved to local rivals TP Mazembe in 2009, where he would play in the 2009 FIFA Club World Cup and the 2010 FIFA Club World Cup, coming on as a substitute in the final where they lost 3–0 to Internazionale. He scored the decisive goal as TP Mazembe won the 2010 CAF Champions League title. In April 2013, he had a trial with Egyptian giant Al Ahly, but was eventually not signed. He joined Moroccan side Raja Casablanca, signing a three-year deal in July 2013.

Déo Kanda has appeared for the senior DR Congo national football team in two 2014 FIFA World Cup qualifying matches.

References

External links
 
 
 
 Déo Kanda at Footballdatabase

1989 births
Living people
People from Matadi
Democratic Republic of the Congo footballers
Democratic Republic of the Congo international footballers
Democratic Republic of the Congo expatriate footballers
Association football forwards
Botola players
Girabola players
4 de Abril F.C. do Cuando Cubango players
TP Mazembe players
Daring Club Motema Pembe players
Raja CA players
AS Vita Club players
Athlitiki Enosi Larissa F.C. players
Simba S.C. players
2011 African Nations Championship players
2013 Africa Cup of Nations players
Expatriate footballers in Morocco
Expatriate footballers in Greece
Expatriate footballers in Angola
Expatriate footballers in Tanzania
Democratic Republic of the Congo expatriate sportspeople in Morocco
Democratic Republic of the Congo expatriate sportspeople in Greece
Democratic Republic of the Congo expatriate sportspeople in Angola
Democratic Republic of the Congo expatriate sportspeople in Tanzania
21st-century Democratic Republic of the Congo people
Tanzanian Premier League players
Democratic Republic of the Congo A' international footballers